Clonsilla is an outer suburb of Dublin in Fingal, Ireland.

Clonsilla is also a civil parish in the barony of Castleknock in the historic County Dublin.

Location and access

Clonsilla used to be a small village in the inner western part of County Dublin, but it is now a large residential suburban area, with Ongar and other localities developing their own subsidiary identities. It falls into the Dublin 15 postal district, the Dublin West Dáil constituency and is locally administered by Fingal County Council.

Clonsilla is roughly equidistant from Blanchardstown and Castleknock.

History
Clonsilla used to be home to horse studs including the famous Ongar stud owned by Prince Aly Khan and his then-wife Rita Hayworth.

In the late 20th and early 21st century, there was significant residential housing development in Clonsilla. Estates such as Mount Symon, Castlefield, Charnwood, Limelawn, Ravenswood, Manorfields, Portersgate, Aldemere and Windermere, were built during the past 20–30 years. As a result, the population of the area rose over the same period.

Places of interest
Luttrellstown Castle, dating from the early 15th century and once owned by members of the Guinness family, is now a hotel and golf course. It was thrown into the spotlight when David Beckham and Victoria Adams married there. American band R.E.M. also stayed here during the Monster World Tour in 1995.

Beech Park is a public park which was opened in May 2009 and is maintained by Fingal County Council. The Shackleton Gardens within Beech Park is home to a walled garden containing rare flower species. It was formerly owned by the Shackleton family.

The Royal Canal is home to several species of freshwater fish such as pike, perch and roach.

Education

Clonsilla has a number of national schools, including St. Mochta's, St. Patrick's, St. Philip's, St. Ciaran's (Hartstown), and Scoil Choilm Community National School (Porterstown). There are five secondary schools in the vicinity: Hartstown Community School, Castleknock Community College, Coolmine Community School, Luttrellstown Community College and Castleknock College. There is also an Educate Together primary and second level school located in Hansfield, Clonsilla.

Religion

Porterstown-Clonsilla is a parish in the Blanchardstown deanery of the Roman Catholic Archdiocese of Dublin. The church of St. Mochta's, located in Porterstown, serves the village proper. There are other parishes in the wider suburb.

In the Church of Ireland, the parish is part of "Castleknock and Mulhuddart with Clonsilla".

There is also a Latter-day Saint meeting house in Clonsilla.

Transport

Clonsilla railway station is an exchange station for commuter services going between Dublin and Maynooth and M3 Parkway lines. Passengers travel to Maynooth to transfer to Dublin to Sligo intercity service. Residents of Ongar and Hansfield can use Hansfield railway station.

Clonsilla is near the N3/M3 national road between Cavan and Dublin city centre.

Clonsilla is served by several Dublin Bus routes including the 39, the 39a and the L52 from Blanchardstown Shopping Centre.

Clonsilla straddles the Royal Canal.

Sport
The local Gaelic Athletic Association clubs are St. Peregrines GAA, Castleknock Hurling and Football Club, and Westmanstown Gaels GAA club. A soccer club, St. Mochta’s F.C., plays at Porterstown Road. A karate club meets in the Clonsilla hall.

People
 Glen Crowe is an Irish professional football forward. He played for Wolves, Bohemians, Shelbourne and Sporting Fingal, and represented the Republic of Ireland national football team on two occasions. Crowe was born and raised in the Clonsilla area.
 Mark Kennedy, the Ipswich Town footballer, is from Clonsilla and started his career at St.Mochta's FC.
 Thomas Luttrell of Luttrellstown Castle ( died 1554 ) Chief Justice of the Irish Common Pleas, was buried in Clonsilla and left a bequest to build a chapel in his memory.
 Emma Ledden, TV and radio presenter, is from Clonsilla.

See also
 List of towns and villages in Ireland

References

Towns and villages in Fingal
Townlands of the barony of Castleknock